Another Story is an album by jazz saxophonist Stanley Turrentine recorded for the Blue Note label in 1969 and performed by Turrentine with Thad Jones, Cedar Walton, Buster Williams, and Mickey Roker.

Reception

The Allmusic review awarded the album 4 stars.

Track listing

Personnel
Stanley Turrentine - tenor saxophone
Thad Jones - flugelhorn (tracks 1-2, 4-5)
Cedar Walton - piano
Buster Williams - bass
Mickey Roker - drums

References

1970 albums
Stanley Turrentine albums
Blue Note Records albums
Albums recorded at Van Gelder Studio
Albums produced by Duke Pearson